World Bowl '96 (also referred to as World Bowl IV) was the fourth championship game of the World League of American Football (WLAF). It took place at Murrayfield Stadium in Edinburgh, Scotland on Sunday, June 23, 1996. The 7–3 Scottish Claymores defeated the 7–3 Frankfurt Galaxy (the defending champions) 32–27 and, led by head coach Jim Criner, completed the league's first ever worst to first turnaround. Claymores wide receiver Yo Murphy was voted MVP for his 163 receiving yards and three touchdowns. 38,982 fans were in attendance that day, the highest in Claymores history and the largest crowd ever assembled for an American football game in Scotland.

Background
The Claymores won the regular season series against the Galaxy, 20–0 in Frankfurt and 20–17 in Edinburgh.

Game summary
The game got off to a fast start as Claymore safety George Coghill, on the opening kickoff, stripped the ball from Mario Bailey's arms. After the ball came out, running back Markus Thomas returned the ball 25 yards for a touchdown, allowing former Scotland rugby union player Gavin Hastings to kick the successful point after touchdown. However, the Galaxy would respond to the Claymores challenge, by having an 11-play, 80-yard drive that ended with Jay Kearney running 16 yards on a reverse play for a touchdown. In the second quarter, Galaxy quarterback Steve Pelluer would develop a 6-play, 30-yard drive that concluded with a two-yard touchdown pass to Mario Bailey. For the first time in the game, the Galaxy led the Claymores, but Scotland refused to enter halftime trailing. Claymore quarterback Jim Ballard would lead two successful drives, late in the half. First, a two-play, 39-yard would set up a six-yard pass to eventual MVP Yo Murphy. The point after touchdown failed. Then, a three-play, 15-yard drive would set the stage for a 16-yard pass to Murphy, but the two-point try failed, due to the Galaxy's pass rush. Still, the Claymores regained their lead, being ahead 19–14 at halftime. In the third quarter, the Claymores increased their lead by adding Paul McCallum's 46-yard field goal to their score. However, the Galaxy would respond with a four-play, 74-yard drive that ended with a 32-yard pass to Mario Bailey, but failed on the two-point conversion. The Claymores would respond with a 71-yard touchdown pass from Ballard to Murphy. The point after touchdown failed. In the fourth quarter, the Claymores would get four points on a 50-yard field goal by McCallum. With the Galaxy down 32–20, they needed points and they needed them fast. They would manage a seven-play, 63-yard drive that ended with a five-yard pass from Steve Pelluer to Mike Bellamy. After the Galaxy managed to get the ball back, they had less than a minute to get a touchdown and defend their title. Some quick passes helped Frankfurt get past midfield, but when the Galaxy reached a fourth and short situation, the mood throughout Murrayfield Stadium was tension. When the ball was snapped, the hand-off to Ingo Seibert was fumbled. Steve Pelluer managed to recover the ball and pick up the first down, but then, a flag was thrown. The referees stated that the fourth down rule was in effect. Since another player recovered the ball, the play was blown dead. It was that play and that rule that preserved the Claymores lead, giving them their 1996 World Bowl title.

References

World Bowl
1996 in American football
June 1996 sports events in the United Kingdom
1996 in Scottish sport
International sports competitions in Edinburgh
1990s in Edinburgh